The 1860 Massachusetts gubernatorial election was held on November 6. Incumbent Republican Governor Nathaniel Banks did not run for re-election to a fourth term. He was succeeded by Republican John Albion Andrew, a radical abolitionist.

Republican convention

Candidates
John Albion Andrew, State Representative from Boston
Henry L. Dawes, U.S. Representative from Pittsfield
John Z. Goodrich, former U.S. Representative from Stockbridge
Ensign H. Kellogg, former State Senator from Pittsfield and Speaker of the Massachusetts House of Representatives

Campaign
Incumbent Governor Nathaniel Banks, a moderate on the slavery issue, supported Congressman Henry L. Dawes as his successor. To give Dawes the greatest possible advantage at the state convention, Banks delayed his retirement announcement as long as possible. However, party chairman William Claflin leaked the news to U.S. Senator Charles Sumner, an abolitionist and supporter of John Albion Andrew. Sumner sprang the Andrew campaign into gear before Banks announced his retirement, allowing them to get the jump on Dawes.

Two additional candidates joined the race: Ensign H. Kellogg and John Z. Goodrich. Both hailed from Berkshire County, like Dawes, and their campaigns may have eaten into his regional support there. By the time the convention opened, Andrew was the strong favorite.

Results
The Republican State Convention was held in Worcester on August 29.

General election

Candidates
 John Albion Andrew, State Representative from Boston (Republican)
 Erasmus Beach, Democratic nominee for Governor from 1855 through 1858 (Douglas Democratic)
 Benjamin Franklin Butler, State Senator from Lowell and Democratic nominee for Governor in 1859 (Breckinridge Democratic)
 Amos Adams Lawrence, textile magnate and American Party candidate for Governor in 1858 (Constitutional Union)

Results

References

Governor
1860
Massachusetts
November 1860 events